is a manga created by Eiichi Shimizu and Tomohiro Shimoguchi. It is a re-imagining of the 1974 manga, created by Go Nagai and Ken Ishikawa

Synopsis
A group of spatial distorting aliens, called the Devolved, start attacking the planet. Three teenagers, Ryoma Nagare, Hayato Jin, and Musashi Tomoe are brought together by Dr. Saotome for their connection to the mysterious Getter Rays. The three of them together need to pilot the most powerful weapon, the Getter Robo, in order to defeat the Devolved.

See also
 Ultraman – Another manga series from the same creators

References

External links
 
  at Seven Seas Entertainment
 

Getter Robo
Akita Shoten manga
Seven Seas Entertainment titles
Shōnen manga